Tribal Opera is an album by Mark Heard (using the pseudonym iDEoLA), released in 1987 on What? Records. It is a full-on solo project, put together by Heard in his home studio using samples and acoustic, electric and electronic instruments. The band name iDEoLA has no particular meaning; of it Heard said, "It's not supposed to be mysterious or anything; I just put a band together and right now I happen to be the only one in it." The album was a big departure step away from the country/folk-rock atmosphere of much of Heard's prior and subsequent music.

Both Rich Mullins and Olivia Newton-John later covered "How to Grow Up Big and Strong" on their own albums. Americana artist John Austin covered "Go Ask the Dead Man".

Track listing
All songs written by Mark Heard.

Side one
 "I Am An Emotional Man" – 4:30
 "Is It Any Wonder" – 3:49
 "Watching the Ship Go Down" – 3:53
 "Talk To Me" – 3:49
 "Go Ask the Dead Man" – 3:52

Side two
 "Love Is Bigger Than Life" – 3:37
 "How to Grow Up Big and Strong" – 5:07
 "Everybody Dances" – 4:07
 "Why Can't We Just Say No" – 4:24
 "Hold Back Your Tears" – 3:47

Personnel 
The band
 iDEoLA – all instruments and vocals

Additional musicians
People who hit things for digital samples at Fingerprint Recorders: Doug Mathews, David McSparran, Steve Hindalong, David Baker (who also played the Wengi Drum introduction for "Talk To Me") and Dan Michaels

Production notes
Produced and recorded by Mark Heard at Fingerprint Recorders, Los Angeles, California
Mixed digitally by Mark Heard at Can Am Recorders, Tarzana, California
Assistants: Stan Katayama, Dan Reed and, Jim Dineen
PCM 1630 editing at Digital Magnetics by Ted Hall
Digital mastering at Futuredisc by Steve Hall
Slaves prepared at Hollywood Sound
Cover design and graphic arts: Tim Alderson
Back cover photo-art by Stewart lvester
Front cover optical textures by Andrew Doucene

References 

1987 albums
Mark Heard albums